Tyers is a small town in Victoria, Australia. It was known until 1852 as "Boola Boola", after which it was named after the surveyor and explorer Charles Tyers.

Tyers Post Office opened on 11 September 1882 .

The town in conjunction with neighbouring Traralgon has an Australian Rules football team Traralgon-Tyers United competing in the North Gippsland Football League.

The Tyers Arts Festival is an annual event, held since 1979, is an initiative of the Tyers Primary school and supported by the Tyers community.

A notable resident was Jean Galbraith.

Features 
 Tyers Lookout is on the Walhalla-Tyers Road (C481), two kilometres from the township on the left. It overlooks the Latrobe Valley.
 Peterson's Lookout is a short walk to the lookout overlooking the Tyers River Gorge, 6 km north of the Tyers township on Walhalla-Tyers Road (C481).  This walk can also be started at the W2 track where there's signage and a trail. This is an extra 2 km (or 4 km return) walk, and is certified as a Heart Foundation Walk.
 The Wirilda Walking Tracks are a series of tracks along the Walhalla-Tyers Road (C481), starting from Wirilda Track 2 (W2) and finishes at W18.

References

Towns in Victoria (Australia)
City of Latrobe